Eeva Riitta "Eve" Fingerroos née Kukkonen (born 4 July 1969) is a retired Finnish Paralympic swimmer who competed in international level events, she specialised in butterfly stroke. She was one of Finland's most successful blind swimmers by winning fourteen medals and competed in five Paralympic Games.

After retiring from swimming, Fingerroos became an entrepreneur designing women's underwear which has sold worldwide.

References

1969 births
Living people
Sportspeople from Oulu
Paralympic swimmers of Finland
Swimmers at the 1984 Summer Paralympics
Swimmers at the 1988 Summer Paralympics
Swimmers at the 1992 Summer Paralympics
Swimmers at the 1996 Summer Paralympics
Swimmers at the 2000 Summer Paralympics
Medalists at the 1984 Summer Paralympics
Medalists at the 1988 Summer Paralympics
Medalists at the 1992 Summer Paralympics
Medalists at the 1996 Summer Paralympics
Medalists at the 2000 Summer Paralympics
Finnish female freestyle swimmers
Finnish female backstroke swimmers
Finnish female butterfly swimmers
Finnish female medley swimmers
S11-classified Paralympic swimmers
20th-century Finnish women
21st-century Finnish women
Finnish women in business